The Church of Saint Nicholas is a church of the Serbian Orthodox Church, located in the village of Brezova, 26 km southwest of Ivanjica. Situated on Mučanj mountain, it was built during the first half of the 17th century at the place of an older church. Folk tradition links the construction of the church with Despot Stefan Lazarević whose fresco portrait is located in the church, although he lived in the 15th century.

An Archeological survey of the church, but also its conservation and restoration was being conducted at several instances (1971–1972, 1973–1975. and 1987), resulting in church's present status of state protected monument of great cultural significance.

Architecture

Saint Nicholas' Church in Brezova is a single-nave building with polygonal dome and backside rose windows. The church's cella is divided into three aisles. The dome is raised over the middle aisle, while the side aisles are topped with barrel vaults. The altar apse has a semi-cylindrical shape. Large narthex and the second (north-side) entrance were built subsequently. The Iconostasis of the older church dating from the 14th century is preserved in the Saint Nicholas' Church.

Primarily because of its plan, but also because of other architectural features, the church is classified in the group of Serbian churches built during the period of Ottoman rule over Serbia and influenced by the old Raška architectural school.

Frescoes

The church's frescos were being painted during the 1730s  by two painters of "entirely different education, talent and artistic styles"  who "failed to accomplish harmonic unity", but their paintings have "exceptionally interesting iconography". The decoration of the greater part of the church was conducted by the less talented of the two, an apprentice of priest Strahinja from Budimlje. The frescos of the second painter are "characterized by the affinity to icon-painting, the elegance of elongated figures and color modeling".

The frescos are dominated by scenes from the life of Saint Nicholas and portraits of Car Lazar of Serbia, Carica Milica and despot Stefan Lazarević. The portrait of despot, placed on a northern wall near the north-west corner of the church, is considered to have been made after an authentic  fresco, which had probably been painted between 1421. and 1427, during the despot Stefan's rule. Next to the despot's portrait, on the western wall, stands the portrait of his father, Lazar of Serbia.

Painter Simeon Lazović made the imperial portal and doorway with Nedraman's eye  in 1805, as a part of the church's iconostasis.

Gallery

See also
 Ivanjica
 Stefan Lazarević

Notes and references
Notes
 
 Zavod za zaštitu spomenika Kraljevo
 

References

External links

Serbian Orthodox church buildings in Serbia
17th-century Serbian Orthodox church buildings
Ivanjica
Cultural Monuments of Great Importance (Serbia)